The Halcyon Days Tour was the second tour by English singer and songwriter Ellie Goulding, in support of her second studio album, Halcyon (2012). The tour visited venues with smaller capacity in North America and Europe. It began on 7 December 2012 in Bristol, England, and ended on 26 August 2014 in Taipei, Taiwan.

Background
On 13 September 2012, it was announced that Goulding would embark on a nine-date tour across the United Kingdom. The tour's official name, The Halcyon Days Tour, was unveiled on 22 October 2012, along with North American dates, which will kick off in Miami Beach on 16 January 2013. "I'm so excited to start touring my new album Halcyon properly. I'm incredibly proud of this record and the reaction has been over-whelming. Touring and playing shows is my favorite part of what I do, and I really can't wait to get on the road", Goulding said. Additional European dates followed on 15 November 2012.

Opening acts

 Yasmin
 Sons & Lovers
 St. Lucia (North America)
 Charli XCX 
 Chlöe Howl
 Chasing Grace
 Broods

Setlists 
{| class="wikitable"
|+
!Setlist
|-
|This show was from O2 Academy Sheffield, Sheffield on 3 October 2013. It does not represent each show on this tour.

 Figure 8
 Ritual
 Goodness Gracious
 Animal
 Starry Eyed
 Guns and Horses
 I Know You Care
 How Long Will I Love You
 Your Song
 Joy
 Explosions
 My Blood
 Only You
 Stay Awake
 Anything Could Happen
 I Need Your Love
 Lights

Encore
You My Everything
 Burn
|}

Tour dates

Notes

Personnel

Band
 Ellie Goulding – lead vocals, drums, guitar
 Christian Ketley – guitar, keyboards, midi fighter, programming
 Simon Francis – bass guitar
 Maxwell Cooke – keyboards
 Joe Clegg – musical director/drums

References

 

Ellie Goulding
2012 concert tours
2013 concert tours
Concert tours of Asia
Concert tours of Canada
Concert tours of Europe
Concert tours of France
Concert tours of the United Kingdom
Concert tours of the United States